Pachydelphus is a genus of African dwarf spiders that was first described by R. Jocqué & R. Bosmans in 1983.

Species
 it contains four species:
Pachydelphus africanus (Simon, 1894) – Gabon, Sierra Leone
Pachydelphus banco Jocqué & Bosmans, 1983 (type) – Ivory Coast
Pachydelphus coiffaiti Jocqué, 1983 – Gabon
Pachydelphus tonqui Jocqué & Bosmans, 1983 – Ivory Coast

See also
 List of Linyphiidae species (I–P)

References

Araneomorphae genera
Linyphiidae
Spiders of Africa